Willow Brook is a river in Otsego County, New York. It drains out of Moe Pond, flows through  Cooperstown, and empties into Otsego Lake.

References

Rivers of New York (state)
Rivers of Otsego County, New York